Christ's Church, Shangcheng District, locally known as Sicheng Christian Church, is a Protestant church located in Shangcheng District of Hangzhou, Zhejiang, China.

History 
In 1859, the Presbyterian Church in the United States of America sent John Livingstone Nevius from Ningbo to Hangzhou to preach. The church was originally built by the Presbyterian Church in the United States of America with the help of Zhang Chengzhai in November 1864. Four years later, Zhang Chengzhai, a Chinese believer and co-founder of the church, was proposed as its first pastor. As the number of believers increased, the management decided to purchase land to prepare for the new church building. Zhang's son, Zhang Baoqing, donated 10,000 silver dollars and the church raised another 50,000 silver dollars. Reconstruction began in 1924 and were completed in 1927. It was put into use in 1930.

The church was closed during the ten-year Cultural Revolution. And was occupied by the Hangzhou Library. On 30 August 1981, it was officially reopened to the public. At the end of 1983, Archbishop of Canterbury Robert Runcie came to visit. In December 2013, it was designated as a municipal cultural relic preservation organ by the Hangzhou government.

Gallery

References

External links

Further reading 
 

Churches in Hangzhou
1927 establishments in China
Churches completed in 1927
Tourist attractions in Hangzhou
Protestant churches in China